Jessica González-Rojas (born May 19, 1976) is an American activist, politician, and academic. A Democrat, she is the New York State Assemblymember for the 34th District, having been elected in 2020 after defeating incumbent Michael DenDekker in the primary.

González-Rojas previously served as the executive director of the National Latina Institute for Reproductive Health, an organization that advocates for access to affordable health and reproductive care for Latino and immigrant communities. González-Rojas has additionally served as an adjunct professor of Latin American Studies at the City University of New York's City College.

Jessica identifies as queer in regards to her sexual orientation and gender identity.
González-Rojas is a member of the Democratic Socialists of America (DSA), the largest socialist organization in the United States.

Early life and education 
González-Rojas earned a bachelor's degree in international relations from Boston University and a Master's in Public Administration (M.P.A.) from New York University's Robert F. Wagner Graduate School of Public Service. González-Rojas is of Paraguayan and Puerto Rican descent.

Career
In 2019, González-Rojas announced she is running in the 2020 Democratic primary for the 34th district of the New York State Assembly, held by Michael DenDekker, and covering parts of Jackson Heights, Woodside, Corona and East Elmhurst, all within Queens, New York. She won the June primary and the November election.

New York State Assembly 
González-Rojas is a member of the Committee on Children and Families, the Committee on Cities, the Committee on Corporations, Authorities and Commissions, the Committee on Environmental Conservation, and the Committee on Social Services. She is also a member of the Asian Pacific American Task Force, the Black, Puerto Rican, Hispanic & Asian Legislative Caucus, the Legislative Women's Caucus, the Task Force on New Americans, the Puerto Rican/Hispanic Task Force, and the Task Force on Women's Issues.

Political views 
González-Rojas is a member of the Democratic Socialists of America (DSA). In her 2020 run, she was endorsed by Bernie Sanders. In the 2021 New York City mayoral election, she was the first elected official to endorse Dianne Morales, a progressive nonprofit executive.

References

Boston University College of Arts and Sciences alumni
Democratic Socialists of America politicians from New York
Democratic Party members of the New York State Assembly
Hispanic and Latino American women in politics
Hispanic and Latino American state legislators in New York (state)
Robert F. Wagner Graduate School of Public Service alumni
City College of New York faculty
Living people
1976 births
21st-century American women